The 2012–13 Cypriot Third Division was the 42nd season of the Cypriot third-level football league. Karmiotissa Polemidion won their 1st title.

Format
Fourteen teams participated in the 2012–13 Cypriot Third Division. All teams played against each other twice, once at their home and once away. The team with the most points at the end of the season crowned champions. The first four teams were promoted to the 2013–14 Cypriot B2 Division and the last two teams were relegated to the 2013–14 Cypriot Fourth Division.

Point system
Teams received three points for a win, one point for a draw and zero points for a loss.

Changes from previous season
Teams promoted to 2012–13 Cypriot Second Division
 AEK Kouklia
 Nikos & Sokratis Erimis
 AEZ Zakakiou

Teams relegated from 2011–12 Cypriot Second Division
 APOP Kinyras1 
 Enosis Neon Parekklisia
 Atromitos Yeroskipou

1APOP Kinyras was relegated to the 2012–13 Cypriot Fourth Division after FIFA's decision.

Teams promoted from 2011–12 Cypriot Fourth Division
 Digenis Oroklinis
 Karmiotissa Polemidion
 Ethnikos Latsion FC

Teams relegated to 2012–13 Cypriot Fourth Division
 Anagennisi Germasogeias1
 POL/AE Maroni2

1Anagennisi Germasogeias withdrew from 2012–13 Cypriot Fourth Division.

2POL/AE Maroni withdrew from 2011–12 Cypriot Third Division.

Stadia and locations

League standings

Results

See also
 Cypriot Third Division
 2012–13 Cypriot First Division
 2012–13 Cypriot Cup for lower divisions

Sources

Cypriot Third Division seasons
Cyprus
2012–13 in Cypriot football